The .416 Ruger is a .41 caliber (10.6 x 65.5mm), rimless, bottlenecked cartridge designed as a joint venture by Hornady and Ruger in 2008. Designed to equal the 416 Rigby and 416 Remington magnum but in a standard length 30-06 length action. The standard length actions are less expensive to manufacture thus making a dangerous game caliber available to a greater amount of customers. Gun manufacturers have not followed Ruger's lead. This also applies to the 375 Ruger. The 416 Ruger is suitable for the biggest land animals and dangerous game.

Description
The cartridge is based on the .375 Ruger case which was necked up to accept a  bullet. It was designed as a dangerous game cartridge particularly for use in Alaska and Africa. The .416 Ruger duplicates the performance of the .416 Rigby and the .416 Remington Magnum. All three cartridge fire a  bullet at  generating  of energy. However, unlike the Remington or Rigby .416s, the Ruger .416 can be chambered in a standard length action, as the cartridge has a length of 3.34 inches. The cartridge has the same diameter of belted magnum cases but without the belt. This provides the cartridge a larger propellant capacity than a standard length magnum cartridge of the same length. The rimless design allows for smoother feeding and extraction of the cartridge.

The .416 Ruger is chambered in the bolt-action Ruger M77 Hawkeye "African" and "guide gun" rifles, and Krieghoff rifles. No other manufacturer currently chambers this cartridge. Ammunition is available from Hornady and Buffalo Bore.

See also 
 List of rifle cartridges
 Table of handgun and rifle cartridges

References

 C.I.P. TDCC (Tables of Dimensions of Cartridges and Chambers) 416 Ruger

External links
 The .416 Ruger - "New Standard for Dangerous Game"

Sturm, Ruger & Company
Pistol and rifle cartridges
Magnum rifle cartridges